HLA-B (major histocompatibility complex, class I, B) is a human gene that provides instructions for making a protein that plays a critical role in the immune system. HLA-B is part of a family of genes called the human leukocyte antigen (HLA) complex. The HLA complex helps the immune system distinguish the body's own proteins from proteins made by foreign invaders such as viruses and bacteria.

HLA is the human version of the major histocompatibility complex (MHC), a gene family that occurs in many species. Genes in this complex are separated into three basic groups: class I, class II, and class III. In humans, the HLA-B gene and two related genes, HLA-A and HLA-C, are the major genes in MHC class I.

MHC class I genes provide instructions for making proteins that are present on the surface of almost all cells. On the cell surface, these proteins are bound to protein fragments (peptides) that have been exported from within the cell. MHC class I proteins display these peptides to the immune system. If the immune system recognizes the peptides as foreign (such as viral or bacterial peptides), it responds by destroying the infected cell.

The HLA-B gene has many different normal variations, allowing each person's immune system to react to a wide range of foreign invaders. Hundreds of versions (alleles) of HLA-B are known, each of which is given a particular number (such as HLA-B27). Closely related alleles are categorized together; for example, at least 28 very similar alleles are subtypes of HLA-B27. These subtypes are designated as HLA-B*2701 to HLA-B*2728.

The HLA-B gene is located on the short (p) arm of chromosome 6 at cytoband 21.3, from base pair 31,353,871 to 31,357,211

Related conditions

Ankylosing spondylitis: A version of the HLA-B gene called HLA-B27 increases the risk of developing ankylosing spondylitis. It is uncertain how HLA-B27 causes this increased risk. Researchers speculate that HLA-B27 may abnormally display to the immune system peptides that trigger arthritis. Other research suggests that joint inflammation characteristic of this disorder may result from improper folding of the HLA-B27 protein or the presence of abnormal forms of the protein on the cell surface. Although most patients with ankylosing spondylitis have the HLA-B27 variation, many people with this particular variation never develop the disorder. Other genetic and environmental factors are likely to affect the chances of developing ankylosing spondylitis and influence its progression.

In addition to Ankylosing spondylitis, HLA-B27 is associated with other spondyloarthropathies, a group of related inflammatory joint diseases. Some of these diseases are associated with a common skin condition called psoriasis or chronic inflammatory bowel disorders (Crohn's disease and ulcerative colitis). One of the spondyloarthropathies, reactive arthritis, is typically triggered by bacterial infections of the gastrointestinal or genital tract. Following an infection, affected individuals may develop arthritis, back pain, and eye inflammation. Like ankylosing spondylitis, many factors probably contribute to the development of reactive arthritis and other spondyloarthropathies.

A large number of studies have shown an association between HLA-B51 And Behçet's disease.

Other disorders: Several variations of the HLA-B gene are associated with adverse reactions to certain drugs. For example, two specific versions of this gene are related to increased drug sensitivity among the Han Chinese population. Individuals who have HLA-B*1502 are more likely to experience a severe skin disorder called Stevens–Johnson syndrome in response to carbamazepine (a drug used to treat seizures). Another version, HLA-B*5801, is associated with an increased risk of severe skin reactions in people treated with allopurinol (a drug used to treat gout, which is a form of arthritis caused by uric acid in the joints).

Among people with human immunodeficiency virus (HIV) infection, a version of HLA-B designated HLA-B*5701 is associated with an extreme sensitivity to abacavir. This drug is a treatment for HIV-1 that slows the spread of the virus in the body. People with abacavir hypersensitivity often develop a fever, chills, rash, upset stomach, and other symptoms when treated with this drug.

Several other variations of the HLA-B gene appear to play a role in the progression of HIV infection to acquired immunodeficiency syndrome (AIDS). AIDS is a disease that damages the immune system, preventing it from effectively defending the body against infections. The signs and symptoms of AIDS may not appear until 10 years or more after infection with HIV. Studies suggest that people with HIV infection who have HLA-B27 or HLA-B57 tend to progress more slowly than usual to AIDS. On the other hand, researchers believe that HIV-positive individuals who have HLA-B35 tend to develop the signs and symptoms of AIDS more quickly than usual. Other factors also influence the progression of HIV to AIDS.

Another version of the HLA-B gene, HLA-B53, has been shown to help protect against severe malaria. HLA-B53 is most common in West African populations, where malaria is a frequent cause of death in children. Researchers suggest that this version of the HLA-B gene may help the immune system respond more effectively to the parasite that causes malaria.

HLA-B and graft compatibility
HLA-B is one of three major HLAs that should be matched between donors and recipients. They are HLA-A, HLA-B, (both Class I MHCs) and HLA-DR (a Class II MHC). If the two tissues have the same genes coding for these three HLAs, the likelihood and severity of rejection is minimized.

See also 
HCP5

References

Further reading 

 
 
 
 
  Full text
 
 
 
  Full text
 
  Full text (PDF)
 
  Full text 
 
 
  Full text(PDF)

This article incorporates public domain text from The U.S. National Library of Medicine

External links 
 
 
 
 Nomenclature for factors of the HLA system
 

HLA-B alleles
Drug-sensitivity genes